Kushal Konwar was an Indian freedom fighter from Assam. He was hanged in 1943 during the Quit India Movement.

Early life, education and work 
Kushal Konwar was born on 21 March 1905 at Chaodang Chariali of Ghiladhari Mouza, Golaghat district (then part of Shivsagar district) of Assam. His family descended from the royal family of Ahom kingdom and used the surname "Konwar", which was later abandoned. Kushal attended the Bezbaruah School. In 1921, while still at school he was inspired by Gandhiji’s call for a non-cooperation movement and took an active part in it. Inspired by Gandhiji’s ideals of Swaraj, Truth and Ahimsa, Konwar set up a primary school at Bengmai and served as its honorary teacher. Later, he joined the Balijan Tea Estate as a clerk where he worked for a while. However, the spirit of independence and call of Mahatma Gandhi inspired him to dedicate himself wholeheartedly in the Independence Movement. He organised the Congress party and lead the people of Sarupathar area in Satyagraha and non-cooperation movement against the British. He was elected the President of the Sarupathar Congress Committee.At dawn on 15 June 1943 at 4:30 am, Kushal Konwar was hanged in Jorhat Jail. He sacrificed his life knowing as Mahatma said: "He alone can be a true satyagrahi who knows the art of living and dying."

Royal Ancestry
His family descended from the royal family of Ahom Kingdom and used the surname "Konwar", which was later abandoned. Born to middle-class parents at the village called Chowdang Chariali of Ghiladhari Mouza of Golaghat District (formerly falling under Sivasagar District) in 
1905, Kushal Konwar was just like other youths of his times, leading a quiet family life. 
But from 1925 onwards, he came under the influence of Mahatma Gandhi and this 
changed the course of his life. Since then, Kushal Konwar pledged to remain a 
vegetarian and accepted the Shrimad Bhagawad Gita as his only companion. Starting 
from the salt satyagraha led by Gandhiji in 1931, Konwar even stopped taking salt. He 
observed these pledges till the last moment of his life. 
Kushal Konwar was quiet and truth loving as a child - the traits that he inherited 
from his parents, Sonaram Konwar, and Kanakeswari Konwar. The fifth child of his 
parents, Kushal Konwar completed his primary school education in 1918 and took 
admission at the Bezbarua Middle English School at Golaghat

Quit India Movement
On 8 August 1942 the Congress Working Committee in its meeting in Bombay passed the "Quit India" resolution. This resolution demanded complete withdrawal of the British from the India’s soil. Mahatma Gandhi gave the call of "do or die" to the people of India. The British reacted by arresting Mahatma and all the Congress leaders and putting them in jails.  Across India, this sparked a widespread mass movement against the British. Cutting across caste, creed, and religion people came out to the streets shouting the slogan of "Vande Mataram". In spite of Gandhiji’s appeal for peaceful non-cooperation and dharna, in many regions the movement erupted in violence with people burning offices and damaging government properties, disrupting road, rail, and telecommunication networks.

Some people of Assam also spontaneously joined this historic movement of 1942. Two of the leaders of the Assam Pradesh Congress, Gopinath Bordoloi and Siddhinath Sarma were arrested by the British in Dhubri while returning from Bombay attending the Congress Working Committee meeting. Other Congress leaders such as Bishnuram Medhi, Bimala Prasad Chaliha, Md. Tayebulla, Omeo Kumar Das, Debeswar Sarma, etc., were arrested from different parts of Assam and thrown into jails. Assam too burned like the rest of India and many people leaving the path of nonviolence engaged in violence.

On 10 October, 1942, hidden in the thick fog of early morning, Indian independence activists removed sleepers from a railway line near Sarupathar in Golaghat district. A military train passing by derailed and over a thousand Allied soldiers were killed. The police immediately cordoned the area and started an operation to catch the culprits. The district magistrate of Jorhat, C.A. Humphrey, issued arrest warrants to all Indian National Congress members in the immediate area.

Accusing Kushal Konwar as the chief conspirator of the train sabotage, the police arrested him. An ardent follower of Gandhiji and his principle of nonviolence, Kushal was ignorant about the sabotage plan and action. He was innocent but the police charged him as the mastermind of the train sabotage. He was brought from Golaghat and was lodged in the Jorhat jail on 5 November 1942.

In the Court of CM Humphrey, Kushal Konwar was declared guilty, though there was not a single proof against him. Kushal was sentenced to death by hanging. He accepted the verdict with dignity. When his wife, Prabhavati visited him in the Jorhat jail, he told her that he is proud that God has selected him to be the only one among the thousands of prisoners to give the supreme sacrifice for the country. Kushal spent his remaining days in the death row cell of Jorhat jail in prayers and reading the Gita.

Martyrdom
At dawn on 15 June 1943 at 4:30 am, Kushal Konwar was hanged in Jorhat Jail. He sacrificed his life knowing as Mahatma said: "He alone can be a true satyagrahi who knows the art of living and dying."

Family
Kushal Konwar married Prabhawati while young and had two sons, Khagen and Nagen. Both sons have died. His late elder son Khagen Konwar had a wife, five sons and five daughters who are still alive. The late Nagen Konwar's family wife and two sons are also still alive and live in Guwahati.

References

External links
 Kushal Konwar: The Only Martyr to be Hanged in 1942. (2005). Government of Assam, translated from Assamese into English by Jolly Saikia Gogoi 
 Kushal Konwar or Swahid Kushal Konwar or Martyr Kushal Konwar. Assam Info. 

1905 births
1943 deaths
Indian anti-war activists
Indian rebels
People from Golaghat
Indian independence activists from Assam
People executed by British India by hanging